Mordellistena pubescens is a species of beetle in the genus Mordellistena in the family Mordellidae. It was described by Johan Christian Fabricius in 1798.

References

Beetles described in 1798
pubescens